Banzon is a department or commune of Kénédougou Province in Burkina Faso.

References 

Departments of Burkina Faso
Kénédougou Province